Werner Milch (15 November 1903 – 17 November 1984) was a German lawyer. 

Milch was born in Wilhelmshaven, the son of Anton Milch, a Jewish pharmacist who served in the Imperial German Navy, and Clara, née Vetter.

During World War II, he served in the Wehrmacht and was a recipient of the Knight's Cross of the Iron Cross of Nazi Germany.

After the war, he acted as co-counsel, alongside , for his brother, ex-field marshal Erhard Milch, in the Milch Trial.

World War II awards
 German Cross in Gold on 15 April 1944 as Hauptmann in the Stab II./Fallschirm-Artillerie-Regiment 2
 Knight's Cross of the Iron Cross on 9 January 1945 as Hauptmann and commander of Fallschirm-Granatwerfer-Lehr- und Ausbildungs-Battalion

References

 
 

1903 births
1984 deaths
People from Wilhelmshaven
People from the Province of Hanover
German people of Jewish descent
Fallschirmjäger of World War II
Recipients of the Gold German Cross
Recipients of the Knight's Cross of the Iron Cross
20th-century German lawyers
Reichswehr personnel
Military personnel from Lower Saxony